Fausto Tardelli is the current Bishop of Pistoia.

He had already been Bishop of  San Miniato, but was translated to Pistoia in 2014 in succession to  Bishop Mansueto Bianchi.

References

External links

21st-century Italian Roman Catholic bishops